Schiattarella is an Italian surname. Notable people with the surname include:

Domenico Schiattarella (born 1967), Italian racing driver
Pasquale Schiattarella (born 1987), Italian footballer

Italian-language surnames